The 2007 SAP Open was a men's tennis tournament played on indoor hard courts. It was the 119th edition of the tournament, and was part of the International Series of the 2007 ATP Tour. It took place at the HP Pavilion in San Jose, California, United States, from February 12 through February 18, 2007. Third-seeded and reigning champion Andy Murray won the singles title.

Finals

 Andy Murray defeated  Ivo Karlović 6–7(3–7), 6–4, 7–6(7–2)

Doubles

 Eric Butorac /  Jamie Murray defeated  Chris Haggard /  Rainer Schüttler 7–5, 7–6(8–6)

References

External links 
 Singles draw
 Doubles draw
 Qualifying draw